Darius Shaquille Leonard (born July 27, 1995) is an American football linebacker for the Indianapolis Colts of the National Football League (NFL). He played college football at South Carolina State and was drafted in the second round of the 2018 NFL Draft by the Colts. In his rookie season, Leonard led the league in tackles and was named a First-Team All-Pro and Defensive Rookie of the Year; he was also voted into the NFL Top 100 the following offseason. Leonard has been informally nicknamed "Maniac" due to his energetic and productive on-field play.

Early years
Leonard attended and played high school football at Lake View High School in Lake View, South Carolina.

College career
Leonard led SCSU in tackles as a redshirt freshman in 2014, compiling 86, 14 for loss, five sacks, and two forced fumbles. He posted 70 stops the following year (2015), 13 of those for loss, with five sacks and two interceptions to earn a first-team all-conference selection as a redshirt sophomore. After the 2016 season, Leonard was named the MEAC defensive player of the year, making SC State the first school to win the award four years in a row. Leonard finished the season with 124 tackles, 14 tackles for loss, 3 sacks, two interceptions, three pass break-ups, and four forced fumbles. He had an impressive game against ACC powerhouse Clemson, totaling 19 tackles. Leonard saved his best for last, as he posted career highs in total tackles (113) and sacks (8) as a senior while picking off two more passes and forcing one fumble. His 73 solo tackles in 2017 put him in the Top 10 in the nation, and 4 of his sacks came in his final two games. He also won the MEAC defensive player of the year award again after the 2017 season.

Professional career
On November 20, 2017, it was announced that Leonard had accepted his invitation to play in the 2018 Senior Bowl. On January 27, 2018, Leonard played in the 2018 Senior Bowl and recorded a game-high 14 combined tackles (five solo) as part of Bill O'Brien's North team that defeated the South 45–16. Leonard's performance at the Senior Bowl immensely helped his draft stock. Leonard attended the NFL Scouting Combine, but was unable to complete all of his combine drills after injuring his quadriceps while running his 40-yard dash. He completed the bench press, 40-yard dash, 20-yard dash, and 10-yard dash at the NFL Combine. On March 20, 2018, Leonard participated at South Carolina State's pro day and performed the rest of his combine drills. At the conclusion of the pre-draft process, Leonard was projected to be a second or third round pick by NFL draft experts and scouts. He was ranked as the sixth best inside linebacker prospect in the draft by NFL analyst Mel Kiper Jr. and was ranked the seventh best outside linebacker by DraftScout.com.

2018

The Indianapolis Colts selected Leonard in the second round with the 36th overall pick in the 2018 NFL Draft. Leonard was the sixth linebacker taken in the draft. 

On July 23, 2018, Leonard signed a four-year, $7.24 million contract that included $4.16 million guaranteed and a signing bonus of $3.35 million.

Leonard entered training camp slated as the starting weakside linebacker. Head coach Frank Reich named Leonard the starting weakside linebacker to start the regular season in 2018, alongside Najee Goode and middle linebacker Anthony Walker Jr.

He made his professional regular season debut and first career start in the Colts' season-opener against the Cincinnati Bengals and recorded nine combined tackles and recovered a fumble in their 34–23 loss. On September 16, 2018, Leonard collected a season-high 19 combined tackles (15 solo) and made his first career sack on Redskins' quarterback Alex Smith during a 21–9 win at the Washington Redskins. For his performance, he was named the AFC Defensive Player of the Week. The following week, Leonard recorded 13 combined tackles (nine solo) and made two sacks on Eagles' quarterback Carson Wentz in the Colts' 20–16 loss at the Philadelphia Eagles in Week 3. On October 4, 2018, after totaling 54 combined tackles (which led the league, and was most by a player in first four weeks of the season since 1994) and four sacks (leading all rookies) in September, Leonard was named the NFL Defensive Rookie of the Month. Leonard was inactive for the Colts’ Week 5 loss at the New England Patriots due to an ankle injury he sustained the previous week. On November 18, 2018, Leonard made seven combined tackles, one pass deflection, one sack, and his first career interception during a 38–10 victory against the Tennessee Titans in Week 11. Leonard intercepted a pass by Titans’ backup quarterback Blaine Gabbert, that was intended for wide receiver Tajae Sharpe, and returned it for a ten-yard gain during the third quarter. In Week 15, Leonard broke the Colts' franchise record for most tackles by a rookie in a single season with 143, in a 23–0 win vs the Dallas Cowboys. In Week 17, Leonard broke the Colts’ franchise record for most tackles in a single season with 163, in a 33–17 win vs the Tennessee Titans. For his performance, Leonard was once again awarded with AFC Defensive Player of the Week. Leonard was awarded the AFC Defensive Player of the Month award for December. He finished his rookie season in 2018 with 163 combined tackles (111 solo), eight pass deflections, seven sacks, and two interceptions in 15 games and 15 starts. Leonard recorded the most tackles among all players as a rookie in 2018. He received an overall grade of 80.3 from Pro Football Focus, which ranked ninth among all linebackers in 2018.

The Indianapolis Colts finished second in the AFC South with a 10–6 record and earned a playoff berth. On January 5, 2019, Leonard started in his first career playoff game and recorded 13 combined tackles (five solo) and broke up a pass attempt during a 21–7 victory at the Houston Texans in the AFC Wildcard Game.

2019

In Week 2 against the Tennessee Titans, Leonard made 10 tackles and one sack on Marcus Mariota as the Colts won 19–17. After the game, Leonard reportedly felt concussion like symptoms and was forced to miss the next three games.  He made his return in Week 7 against the Houston Texans.  In the game, Leonard recorded a team high ten tackles and an interception off Deshaun Watson in the 30–23 win. In Week 10 against the Miami Dolphins, Leonard recorded a team high 13 tackles, sacked Ryan Fitzpatrick once, intercepted a pass thrown by Fitzpatrick, and forced a fumble on tight end Mike Gesicki which was recovered by teammate Kenny Moore in the 16–12 loss. In Week 13 against the Tennessee Titans, Leonard recorded 12 tackles and sacked Ryan Tannehill twice in the 31–17 loss. In Week 14, against the Tampa Bay Buccaneers, Leonard recorded nine tackles and intercepted two passes thrown by Jameis Winston, one of which was returned for an 80 yard pick six, during the 38–35 loss.

Following the season, he was voted into his first Pro Bowl appearance. Despite missing three games due to injury, Leonard had a team-leading 121 tackles including 71 solos, six tackles for loss, five sacks, six passes defended, five interceptions, and two forced fumbles. He also became the first NFL player since 1982 to have 10-plus sacks and five-plus interceptions in his first 25 games.

2020
In Week 8 against the Detroit Lions, Leonard recorded a team high nine tackles and recorded a strip sack on quarterback Matthew Stafford which was recovered by the Colts during the 41–21 win.
In Week 9 against the Baltimore Ravens, Leonard recorded a team high 15 tackles (13 solo) and recovered a fumble forced by DeForest Buckner on Gus Edwards during the 24–10 loss.
In Week 12 against the Tennessee Titans, Leonard recorded a team high 14 tackles and sacked Ryan Tannehill once during the 45–26 loss.
In Week 15 against the Houston Texans, Leonard led the team with 15 tackles and forced a fumble on wide receiver Keke Coutee that was recovered by the Colts during the 27–20 win.
In Week 17 against the Jacksonville Jaguars, Leonard led the team with 10 tackles and recorded a strip sack on Mike Glennon that was recovered by the Colts during the 28–14 win.
Leonard was named the AFC Defensive Player of the Week for his performance.

2021
On August 8, 2021, Leonard signed a five-year, $99.25 million contract including a $52.5 million guaranteed extension with the Colts, making him the highest-paid outside linebacker in the NFL.

In Week 15, Leonard had 10 tackles, one tackle for loss, a forced fumble, and an interception in a 27-17 win over the New England Patriots, earning AFC Defensive Player of the Week.

Leonard was named Associated Press First Team All-Pro. He is a four-time All-Pro choice (First Team in 2018, 2020 and 2021; Second Team in 2019). Leonard has the most total All-Pro selections and the most First Team All-Pro selections by a linebacker in Colts history.

He was also named to his third consecutive Pro Bowl (third of his career).

During the following offseason, Leonard had surgery on his back to correct nerves being impinged by his disks.

2022
Leonard missed the first three weeks of the season while recovering from offseason back surgery. He returned in Week 4, and suffered a concussion and broken nose in the game, missing the next three games. He suffered a setback in his back injury leading up to Week 10 and was placed on injured reserve on November 12, 2022.

NFL career statistics

NFL awards

 NFL Defensive Rookie of the Year (2018)
AP First Team All-Pro (2018; 2020; 2021)
AP Second Team All-Pro (2019)
 
 4x AFC Defensive Player of the Week (Week 2, 2018; Week 17, 2018; Week 17, 2020; Week 15, 2021)
 AFC Defensive Player of the Month (December 2018)
 NFL Defensive Rookie of the Month (September 2018)
 3x Pro Bowl (2019-2021)

Personal life
Leonard is one of nine children to a single mother. In middle school, two of his older brothers were arrested and sentenced to life for murder. He is also the younger brother to former NFL player Anthony Waters. On November 11, 2017, Leonard proposed to his girlfriend Kayla, whom he had known since kindergarten, after SC State beat Hampton. In December 2018, Leonard announced the couple was expecting a baby girl. On March 28, 2019, Mia Leonard was born. On June 4, 2021, Leonard welcomed daughter Laila. 

Leonard appeared on the July 12, 2020 episode of Celebrity Family Feud in which the NFL rising stars took on retired NFL Hall of Famers, which included players such as Michael Irvin and Cris Carter.

On July 26, 2022, at the Colts' training camp, Leonard told reporters how he now requested to be called by his middle name, Shaquille, rather than his given first name, Darius.

References

External links
Darius Leonard on Twitter
South Carolina State Bulldogs bio
Indianapolis Colts bio

1995 births
Living people
People from Dillon County, South Carolina
Players of American football from South Carolina
American football linebackers
South Carolina State Bulldogs football players
Indianapolis Colts players
National Football League Defensive Rookie of the Year Award winners
American Conference Pro Bowl players
Ed Block Courage Award recipients